Scoresby Sound  (Danish: Scoresby Sund, Greenlandic: Kangertittivaq) is a large fjord system of the Greenland Sea on the eastern coast of Greenland. The longest of the fjords extends 340–350 km (210-216 mi) inland from the coastline. It is one of the largest and longest fjord systems in the world.

On the northern side of the mouth of the Scoresby Sound stands Ittoqqortoormiit, the only permanent settlement in the region, with a population of 469 (in 2010).
The name of the sound honours English explorer William Scoresby, who in 1822 mapped the fjord area in detail.

Geography
Scoresby Sound lies between Jameson Land to the north, and Knud Rasmussen Land to the south. To the west beyond Milne Island is the Renland peninsula. The land surrounding the fjord is mostly mountainous, with steep rising edges.
The mouth is 29 km wide between the Kangikajik (Cape Brewster, 70°09'N) at the end of the Savoia Peninsula and Uunarteq (Cape Tobin 70°24'N). Its southern part is a steep, 1000–2000 m (3,280-6,560 ft) tall wall of basalt, and the northern side is lower and more rounded. The mouth extends for about 110 km (68 mi) to the west, slightly turns north, widens, and forms a basin called Hall Bredning.
At Nordestbucht on Jameson Land is the Gurreholm research station, founded in 1937. During the Second World War it was the site of the US Coastguard’s Bluie East Three weather station.

Main fjords
The Hall Bredning basin splits into several branches including the Nordvestfjord, Ofjord (Øfjord)—which splits into the Rype Fjord and Hare Fjord, Rode Fjord (Røde Fjord), Gase Fjord (Gåsefjord) and Fonfjord (Fønfjord). Between the Ofjord and Fonfjord lies the largest island of the system, Milne Land.

 Fonfjord (Fønfjord)
 Rode Fjord (Røde Fjord)
 Vestfjord
 Gaasefjord (Gåsefjord)
 Hurry Inlet
 Ofjord (Øfjord)
 Hare Fjord
 Rype Fjord
 Snesund
 Nordvestfjord
Flyver Fjord

Islands
Among the islands in the Scoresby Sound the largest is by far Milne Land and the other islands in the sound are near it. Other islands are Storo and Sorte Island off the northwestern shore of Milne Land, Rode Island further south in Rode Fjord, Danmark Island off Milne Land's southern coast, and the Bjorne Islands off the northeastern headland of Milne Land.

Climate
The climate is Arctic, with the long cold winter and severe storms. The temperatures of January–March vary between –22.5 °C (-8.5 °F) and –8.4 °C (16.9 °F) with the average between –15 °C (5 °F) and –18 °C (0 °F) over the period 1971–1981. The mean summer temperatures are below 5 °C (41 °F). Precipitation is low, at about 30 mm (1.2 in) per month. Tides are semidiurnal, with the amplitude of 1.3 meters (4 ft 4 in).

Fauna

The fauna of the region is unusually rich for Greenland. This is because of several factors, such as availability of open water in the mouth, with polynyas not freezing even in winter, protection from the winds by the high relief, and relatively fertile land. The land animals include muskox, Arctic fox, stoat, mountain hare and lemming. Reindeer and Arctic wolf used to live in the area, but disappeared around the early 20th century.

Birds are represented by barnacle goose, pink-footed goose, snow goose, whooper swan, king eider, common eider, long-tailed duck, Brunnich's guillemot, black guillemot, little auk, puffin, fulmar, herring gull, glaucous gull, great black-backed gull, kittiwake, Arctic tern, red-throated diver, great northern diver, red-breasted merganser, ptarmigan, raven, snowy owl, Greenlandic gyrfalcon, etc. Most of them are migrating species and form large colonies which may contain up to millions of individuals (for little auk).

Fishes of the area include Arctic char, Greenland halibut, polar cod, cuttlefish, wolf fish and Greenland shark. Aquatic mammals are dominated by seals (ringed, hooded, harbor, bearded and harp seal) which feed on fish in winter (mostly polar cod) and crustaceans in summer. Larger species include Atlantic walrus, narwhal and sometimes beluga whale. Atlantic walrus feeds on mussels, fish and ringed seals that urges ringed seals to disappear from the area when walruses stay there for prolonged periods. Narwhals consume polar cod, Greenland halibut, cuttlefish and pelegaec crustaceans.

See also
List of fjords of Greenland
Scoresby Land

References

Bibliography

External links

Detailed map of the Scoresby Sund